Joseph Emmanuel Chealey (born November 1, 1995) is an American professional basketball player for MKS Dąbrowa Górnicza of the Polish Basketball League (PLK). He played college basketball for College of Charleston. He was born in Orlando, Florida where he grew up and went to Apopka High School.

College career
Chealey was a part of the 2013 recruiting class and was a part of the College of Charleston Cougars' 14–18 team as a freshman. After the season, coach Earl Grant was hired and Chealey developed a strong relationship with him despite the team winning just nine games in Grant's first season. Chealey missed his junior year with a torn Achilles tendon in one of the first practices. He averaged 17.2 points per game 3.3 assists per game as a redshirt junior and was named to the First-team All-CAA. As a senior, Chealey was seventh in the conference in scoring with 18.0 points per game and fifth in assists with 3.7 assists per game. He was a repeat selection to the First-team All-CAA. He had 32 points in an 83–76 overtime victory over Northeastern in the conference championship to punch a ticket to the NCAA Tournament. Chealey was also named to the CAA All-Tournament team for a second straight season. During his four seasons of college career Chealey averaged 14.2 points, 3.5 rebounds and 3.1 assists in 31.1 minutes per game.

Professional career

Charlotte Hornets (2018–2019)
After going undrafted in the 2018 NBA draft, Chealey played for the Charlotte Hornets 2018 summer league team. On July 27, 2018, Chealey joined the Hornets on a training camp deal. On October 13, his contract was converted into a two-way contract, meaning he will split his playing time between the Hornets and their NBA G League affiliate, the Greensboro Swarm, for the majority of the season. Chealey made his NBA debut with the Hornets on January 30, 2019 in a blowout loss to the Boston Celtics, scoring two points with an assist.

On August 6, 2019, the Hornets announced that they had re-signed Chealey.

Greensboro Swarm (2019–2020)
Chealey was cut from the roster on October 13, 2019 during training camp. Following training camp, Chealey was re-added to the roster of the Swarm. He tallied 22 points, five rebounds, five assists, a steal and a block in a loss to the Delaware Blue Coats on December 19. On December 28, Chealey nearly posted a triple-double with 15 points, 10 rebounds, eight assists and four steals against the Raptors 905.

Return to the Charlotte Hornets (2020)
On February 21, 2020, Chealey was signed to a 10-day contract by the Hornets, and a second 10-day contract on March 3.

Hapoel Gilboa Galil (2021)
On August 5, 2021, Chealey signed with Hapoel Gilboa Galil of the Israeli Basketball Premier League.

Return to the Greensboro Swarm (2021–2022)
On November 9, 2021, the Greensboro Swarm announced that they had added Chealey to their roster.

MKS Dąbrowa Górnicza (2022–present)
On August 4, 2022, he has signed with MKS Dąbrowa Górnicza of the Polish Basketball League (PLK).

Career statistics

NBA

Regular season

|-
| style="text-align:left;"| 
| style="text-align:left;"| Charlotte
| 1 || 0 || 8.0 || .333 || – || – || .0 || 1.0 || .0 || .0 || 2.0
|-
| style="text-align:left;"| 
| style="text-align:left;"| Charlotte
| 4 || 0 || 8.3 || .000 || .000 || 1.000 || .0 || .3 || 1.0 || .0 || .5
|- class="sortbottom"
| style="text-align:center;" colspan="2"| Career
| 5 || 0 || 8.2 || .100 || .000 || 1.000 || .0 || .4 || .8 || .0 || .8

College

|-
| style="text-align:left;"| 2013–14
| style="text-align:left;"| College of Charleston
| 27 || 10 || 20.7 || .365 || .297 || .667 || 2.0 || 2.0 || .7 || .3 || 6.9
|-
| style="text-align:left;"| 2014–15
| style="text-align:left;"| College of Charleston
| 33 || 32 || 32.5 || .402 || .306 || .758 || 3.6 || 3.3 || .9 || .2 || 12.4
|-
| style="text-align:left;"| 2015–16
| style="text-align:left;"| College of Charleston
| 35 || 33 || 33.8 || .432 || .392 || .822 || 3.5 || 3.2 || 1.0 || .0 || 17.8
|-
| style="text-align:left;"| 2016–17
| style="text-align:left;"| College of Charleston
| 34 || 34 || 35.4 || .393 || .348 || .858 || 4.6 || 3.6 || .9 || .1 || 18.0
|- class="sortbottom"
| style="text-align:center;" colspan="2"| Career
| 129 || 109 || 31.1 || .404 || .347 || .805 || 3.5 || 3.1 || .9 || .1 || 14.2

References

External links
College of Charleston Cougars bio

1995 births
Living people
21st-century African-American sportspeople
African-American basketball players
American men's basketball players
Basketball players from Orlando, Florida
Charlotte Hornets players
College of Charleston Cougars men's basketball players
Greensboro Swarm players
MKS Dąbrowa Górnicza (basketball) players
Point guards
Undrafted National Basketball Association players